The 2016 Patriot League women's soccer tournament was the postseason women's soccer tournament for the Patriot League held from November 1 to 6, 2016. The five match tournament was held at campus sites, with the semifinals and final held at Emmitt Field in Lewisburg, Pennsylvania. The six team single-elimination tournament consisted of three rounds based on seeding from regular season conference play. The Boston University Terriers were the defending tournament champions after defeating the Bucknell Bison in the championship match.

Bracket

Schedule

First Round

Semifinals

Final

References

External links 

 
Patriot League Women's Soccer Tournament